Jagat Narain Lal College also known as JNL College, Khagaul is a degree college in Khagaul, Bihar, India. It is a constituent unit of Patliputra University. College offers Senior secondary education and Undergraduate degree in Arts and Science.

History 
College was established in the year 1960. The land was then donated by Late Jagat Narain Lal, who was a freedom fighter and a Cabinet minister of Bihar. It was first affiliated to Babasaheb Bhimrao Ambedkar Bihar University on establishment in 1960. Later on, it became the constituent unit of Magadh University. Further, in 2018, college became a constituent unit of Patliputra University.

Degrees and courses 
College offers the following degrees and courses.

 Bachelor's degree
 Bachelor of Arts
 Bachelor of Science
 Master's degree
 Master of Arts
 Master of Science

References

External links 

 Official website of college
 Patliputra University website

Constituent colleges of Patliputra University
Educational institutions established in 1960
Universities and colleges in Patna
1960 establishments in Bihar